Urunboi Ashurovich Ashurov (Tajik:Ӯрунбой Ашӯров) (1903–1938) was First Secretary of the Communist Party of Tajikistan between September 1937 and March 1938.

He was born in Fergana and was executed during the Great Purge.

References
 Starr, S. Frederick, Ferghana Valley: The Heart of Central Asia, London and New York, Routledge, 2011, p. 139.

1903 births
1938 deaths
People from Fergana
People from Fergana Oblast
First Secretaries of the Communist Party of Tajikistan
Great Purge victims from Uzbekistan
Heads of government of the Tajik Soviet Socialist Republic

Recipients of the Order of the Red Banner of Labour